Phytophthora citricola is a plant pathogen. It was first described by Kaneyoshi (Kenkichi) Sawada in 1927 when it was isolated from orange trees in present-day Taiwan. It has since been found causing disease on a wide variety of plants.

See also
 List of citrus diseases

References

External links
 Index Fungorum
 USDA ARS Fungal Database

Citricola
Citrus diseases
Species described in 1927
Water mould plant pathogens and diseases